Robert Joseph Fallon (born February 18, 1960) is a retired Major League Baseball pitcher. He played during two seasons at the major league level for the Chicago White Sox.

Fallon played baseball at Hollywood Hills High School in Hollywood, Florida where he was teammates with Bill Lindsey, who would also go on to play for the White Sox.

He was drafted by the White Sox in the 1st round (15th pick) of the secondary phase of the 1979 amateur draft.

References

External links
, or Retrosheet, or Pura Pelota (Venezuelan Winter League)

1960 births
Living people
Appleton Foxes players
Buffalo Bisons (minor league) players
Chicago White Sox players
Denver Bears players
Denver Zephyrs players
Glens Falls Tigers players
Glens Falls White Sox players
Fallon, Bob
Major League Baseball pitchers
Miami Dade College alumni
Miami Dade Sharks baseball players
Nashville Sounds players
Niagara Falls Pirates players
Sportspeople from the Bronx
Baseball players from New York City
Tigres de Aragua players
American expatriate baseball players in Venezuela